Giulia Molinaro (born 23 July 1990) is an Italian professional golfer and LPGA Tour player. She tied for third at the 2021 Women's PGA Championship and represented Italy at the 2016 Summer Olympics and the 2020 Summer Olympics.

Early life and amateur career 
Molinaro was born in Camposampiero in Veneto, Northern Italy, but lived in Kenya for the majority of her childhood, due to her father's career in hotel management. She started playing golf at the age of 12. 

She was member of the Italian National team and represented Italy at the Espirito Santo Trophy and the European Ladies' Team Championship, and played on the European team at the 2006 Junior Ryder Cup. Individually, she was leading girl at the 2007 Duke of York Young Champions Trophy and finished sixth at the 2008 European Ladies Amateur.

Molinaro played college golf at Arizona State University between 2008 and 2012, where she was named Pac-12 Conference Player of the Year in her final season.

Professional career 
Molinaro turned professional in October 2012 and joined the Symetra Tour. In 2013, she recorded one victory at the Friends of Mission Charity Classic and four additional top-10 finishes, earning Rookie of the Year honors. She finishing second on the money list, earning her an LPGA Tour card for 2014. After making only 8 cuts in 18 events and finishing 114th on the money list in 2014, she was back on the Symetra Tour in 2015. She again finished second on the money list and returned to the LPGA Tour in 2016.

She tied for third at the 2021 Women's PGA Championship after which she broke into the top-100 on the Women's World Golf Rankings for the first time.

Amateur wins
2007 Girls Junior Orange Bowl
2011 Dale McNamara Invitational
2012 Swiss International Amateur

Source:

Professional wins (1)

Symetra Tour wins (1)

Results in LPGA majors
Results not in chronological order.

CUT = missed the half-way cut
NT = No tournament
"T" = tied

Team appearances
Junior Ryder Cup (representing Europe): 2006 (tie, Cup retained)
Espirito Santo Trophy (representing Italy): 2008, 2010, 2012
European Ladies' Team Championship (representing Italy): 2009, 2010, 2011

References

External links

Italian female golfers
LPGA Tour golfers
Olympic golfers of Italy
Golfers at the 2016 Summer Olympics
Golfers at the 2020 Summer Olympics
Arizona State Sun Devils women's golfers
Mediterranean Games medalists in golf
Mediterranean Games bronze medalists for Italy
Competitors at the 2009 Mediterranean Games
Sportspeople from the Province of Padua
Italian expatriates in the United States
1990 births
Living people
20th-century Italian women
21st-century Italian women